Casino Español de Manila is a club established in 1893 by Spaniards living in the Philippines as their exclusive venue for recreational and social activities. It later opened its doors to Filipino members to foster Spanish-Filipino ties in the country. It is located at No. 855 Teodoro M. Kalaw Extension, Ermita, Manila.

It is one of the three Casino Español clubhouses in the country, the others being in Cebu (built in 1920 and still operating) and Iloilo (built in 1926 and left in ruins after World War II destruction).

History

Spanish period
Earlier records show that Governor General Narciso Clavería y Zaldúa formalized the foundation of the casino in Manila on October 31, 1844, the date which is celebrated by the casino as the year of its founding.

American colonial period

The first building of the Casino Español de Manila was built in 1913 but formally opened in 1917. It was designed by Architect Juan Arellano, incorporating influences of neo-renaissance style.

The structure used to occupy the whole block from Taft Avenue to San Marcelino Street and housed the offices of the Spanish Chamber of Commerce and the Consulate General of Spain. As the official clubhouse and social venue of the Spanish community, the building's reception and banquet halls hosted parties, celebrations and balls. Among the noted events in this venue in the 1930s was the extravagant party held to celebrate the birthday of the King of Spain. Apart from attending parties in its halls, guests could also view the garden from the terrace while members could play tennis and pelota games in its courts.

In 1945, the structure was destroyed in World War II during the Liberation of Manila. The club was temporarily moved to a two-story house along Apacible Street (formerly Oregon) and Perez Street in Paco, Manila.

Post-War period
In 1951, Casino Español de Manila was rebuilt on its original site through the help of Ignacio Planas. Parts of the property were sold and the new structure was built facing San Luis Street (now Kalaw Avenue). The new clubhouse was designed by Architect José María Zaragoza using the prevalent post-World War II “Filipino-California-Spanish style”. The structure has arched verandas surrounding an inner courtyard.

The new clubhouse was inaugurated on November 3, 1951, with President Elpidio Quirino and Vice-president Fernando López in attendance. In 1962, it played host to the Infante Juan Carlos of Spain (later King Juan Carlos I) and Princess Sofía of Greece and Denmark (later Queen Sofía). Queen Sofía visited the club once again in 2000 during an official visit to the Philippines.

The Present 
While the Casino Español traditionally services its members, guests and visitors have been welcomed to its compound. The 50-seat Comedor Cervantes serves a traditional range of Spanish, Filipino and international cuisine. Huge antique decorative plates adorn the high walls, individually crafted and hand-painted bearing the coat-of-arms of each of the provincial districts of Spain. The adjoining Bar el Quixote is a well-stocked chamber of select Spanish wines and other spirits.  At the back, it has a fronton that is used for jai alai and pelota games. Beside the Casino is the space formerly occupied by the Instituto Cervantes de Manila where Spanish classes were held, that promoted the Spanish heritage of the Philippines.

The club holds its open-air festivities in its quadrangle, the Patio de Orquidias, where annual events are celebrated, such as the "El Día de Reyes", commemorating the feast of the Magi; and the "Dia de Santiago"  that commemorates the feast of Saint James the Apostle, the patron saint of Spain. A central architectural feature of the edifice is a cloister, lined with the club's ballroom, the Salon de Rizal; and function rooms such as the Salon El Cid for large group events, the Salon de Alegre for the "caballeros", and the elaborate Salon de Señoras lounge for ladies. Towards the club's Fronton where games of Jai alai and pelota are held, is the austere Biblioteca Academia de la Lengua Española, a library housing a choice collection of artifacts and journals about Spain. In 1993, the National Historical Commission of the Philippines erected a marker at the entrance of the Casino, declaring its premises as a Level-II heritage structure.

The Club Presidents 
A chronological listing of the club's presidents and their terms:

Platos Especiales  
The everyday allure of the Casino Español is the Comedor de Cervantes, a well-appointed dining room serving its community with some of the closest to authentic Iberian cuisine in Manila.

The highlights of this well-regarded gastronomic enclave include their popular paellas, such as the Paella a la Valenciana,  the traditional paella of the Valencia region, a rice dish made of seafood, sausage, chicken and pork; the Arroz a la Marinera, a Spanish rice dish made of fish and shellfish; and the Arroz a la Negro, a rice dish made of seafood with squid ink that makes the rice color black. Other favorites are the Callos a la Andaluza, an Andalucían-style ox tripe stew; and the Fabada Asturiana,  a rich bean stew. One of the Comedor'''s most notable chefs was Anastacio de Alba, who later founded his own Spanish restaurants. In recent years, the Casino Español de Manila has opened its dining room to all nationalities in its endeavor to strengthen ties with locals.

 (The Filipino pronunciation of the paella'' suite of dishes is "paelya", enunciated with [lj] instead of the Spanish [ʎ].)

Images

References

External links

Casino Español de Manila in Trip Advisor
Casino Español de Manila in the Filipinas Heritage Library

1951 establishments in the Philippines
Buildings and structures in Ermita
Buildings and structures completed in 1951
Clubhouses
Cultural Properties of the Philippines in Metro Manila
Spanish Colonial Revival architecture
Sports venues in Manila
Works of National Artists of the Philippines
Organizations based in Manila
Organizations established in 1844
1844 establishments in the Philippines
1844 establishments in Asia
Buildings and structures completed in 1917
1917 establishments in the Philippines
1940s disestablishments in the Philippines

20th-century architecture in the Philippines